The Bachelor is an American dating reality television series created for ABC by Mike Fleiss. It was hosted by Chris Harrison for the first twenty-five seasons, former Bachelor Jesse Palmer returning to The Bachelor franchise as the host from season twenty-six. The series is produced by Next Entertainment and Warner Horizon Television, and revolves around a single bachelor who starts with a pool of romantic interests from whom he is expected to select a wife. During the course of the season, the bachelor eliminates candidates, culminating in a marriage proposal to his final selection. The participants travel to romantic and exotic locations for their adventures, and the conflicts in the series, both internal and external, stem from the elimination-style format of the show.

 On May 13, 2022, ABC renewed the series for a twenty-seventh season, which premiered on January 23, 2023.

Series overview

Episodes

Season 1 (2002)

Season 2 (2002)

Season 3 (2003)

Season 4 (2003)

Season 5 (2004)

Season 6 (2004)

Season 7 (2005)

Season 8: Paris (2006)

Season 9: Rome (2006)

Season 10: Officer and a Gentleman (2007)

Season 11 (2007)

Season 12: London Calling (2008)

Season 13 (2009)

Season 14: On the Wings of Love (2010)

Season 15 (2011)

Season 16 (2012)

Season 17 (2013)

Season 18 (2014)

Season 19 (2015)

Season 20 (2016)

Season 21 (2017)

Season 22 (2018)

Season 23 (2019)

Season 24 (2020)

Season 25 (2021)

Season 26 (2022)

Season 27 (2023)

Specials

Notes

References

External links
 
 

The Bachelor (American TV series)
Lists of American reality television series episodes